The World Figure Skating Championships is an annual figure skating competition sanctioned by the International Skating Union in which figure skaters compete for the title of World Champion.

The 1952 competitions for men, ladies, pair skating, and ice dancing took place from February 27 to March 1 in Paris, France. The World Championships in ice dancing were the first of its kind.

Results

Men

Judges:
 Oscar Madl 
 Donald H. Gilchrist 
 Gérard Rodrigues-Henriques 
 J. Wilson 
 Ercole Cattaneo 
 H. Storke 
 J. Biedermann

Ladies

Judges:
 F. Wojtanoskyj 
 A. Voordeckers 
 Norman Gregory 
 Gérard Rodrigues-Henriques 
 V. P. Gross 
 Mollie Phillips 
 Ercole Cattaneso 
 E. Kirchhofer 
 J. Krupy

Pairs

Judges:
 Hans Meixner 
 Donald H. Gilchrist 
 Gérard Rodrigues-Henriques 
 P. Gross 
 Pamela Davis 
 A. W. Kneteman 
 Ercole Cattaneo 
 A. J. Krupy 
 J. Biedermann

Ice dancing

Judges:
 Hans Meixner 
 A. Voordeckers 
 Norman Gregory 
 Henri Meudec 
 Mollie Phillips 
 R. Sackett 
 E. Kirchhofer

Sources
 Result List provided by the ISU

World Figure Skating Championships
World Figure Skating Championships
World Figure Skating Championships
International figure skating competitions hosted by France
World Figure Skating Championships
International sports competitions hosted by Paris
World Figure Skating Championships
World Figure Skating Championships